December Avenue is the self-titled debut studio album by Filipino band December Avenue. It was released on February 15, 2016, by Tower of Doom Records.

Background
After independently releasing two EPs, December Avenue released their first studio album in February 2016. Released under Tower of Doom Music, the album contains 11 tracks that took 5 years to make. When asked why it took years for December Avenue to release an official debut album, vocalist Zel Bautista explained that aside from their conflicting schedules, building hype was crucial in the process of creating one. The same question was asked during December Avenue's Rappler Live Jam performance, with Bautista saying that it did not feel right to release an album without much of a following. Members added that they felt that December Avenue have fulfilled their musical destiny upon the album's release, and that they are “overwhelmed.”

Singles
December Avenue released their first single, “Time To Go” in 2010, and it started their slow rise to the mainstream indie circuit. Regularly playing gigs, December Avenue has gained a steady fan base since then.

The second single ("Sleep Tonight"), the third single ("I'll Be Watching You"), and the fourth single ("City Lights") from the album were released on 2011 via EP called Sleep Tonight.

Track listing

Personnel

December Avenue
Zel Bautista - vocals, acoustic guitar 
Jem Manuel - lead guitar 
Don Gregorio - bass guitar 
Jet Danao - drums, percussion, backing vocals 
Gelo Cruz - keyboards, backing vocals

References

External links

2016 debut albums